Anne Wilson, Lady Wilson (née Adams) (11 June 1848 – 11 February 1930) was an Australian poet and novelist. Most of her work was published as Mrs James Glenny Wilson or the pseudonym Austral.

Biography
Adams was born in 1848 at Greenvale, Victoria. Her mother, Jane Anderson, was Scottish, and her father, the farmer Robert Adams, was Irish. She was known as Annie, and she received her education at Geelong High School and at a private institution in St Kilda, Victoria. After her schooling, she travelled through Europe with her mother. On 21 January 1874, she married James Wilson at St Enochs station near Skipton, Victoria. Her husband had bought  of land in the Rangitikei District of New Zealand in 1873, and by the end of 1874, the Wilsons were living there. They lived in their homestead, which they called Lethenty, for the rest of their lives, but she always identified with Australia throughout her life. James Wilson, a well-known public man, was knighted in 1915.

Annie Wilson's first book of poems, Themes and Variations, came out in London in 1889 and was followed by a novel, Alice Lauder, a Sketch, in 1893. Another novel, Two Summers published by Harper in 1900, was later included in Macmillan's colonial library. In 1901 A Book of Verses was published (new and slightly enlarged edition, 1917), a collection of her poems from English, American and Australian magazines. Her husband died in 1929 leaving her with two sons and two daughters. Lady Wilson died at Lethenty and is buried in the Clifton Cemetery at Bulls. Some of her poems are included in several Australian and New Zealand anthologies.

References

1848 births
1930 deaths
Australian poets
Australian women novelists
Australian women poets
People from Manawatū-Whanganui
Writers from Melbourne
Australian emigrants to New Zealand
People from the City of Hume